Muhammad Jufri bin Taha (born 4 March 1985) is a Singaporean footballer who plays as a defender for S.League club Geylang International.

References

External links 
 
 

Living people
1985 births
Singaporean footballers
Singapore international footballers
Association football defenders
Balestier Khalsa FC players
Tampines Rovers FC players
Singapore Premier League players